Plain and Simple is a Canadian short drama film, directed by Raphaël Ouellet and released in 2016.

The film centres on four people struggling with feelings of isolation and loneliness.

The film was screened at the Cannes Film Market before having its theatrical premiere at the 2016 Toronto International Film Festival.

The film received a nomination for Best Short Film at the 19th Quebec Cinema Awards, and a Canadian Screen Award nomination for Best Live Action Short Film at the 6th Canadian Screen Awards.

References

2016 films
2016 short films
Canadian drama short films
Quebec films
French-language Canadian films
2010s Canadian films